Kanshi (also Kunshih), formerly known as Tai-ping, is a town in southwestern Fujian province, People's Republic of China. It is under the administration of Yongding District, Longyan. , it administers Kanshi Street Residential Community and the following six villages:
Xiushan Village
Wenguan Village
Qingxi Village
Xinluo Village
Fushan Village
Qiaxi Village

Transport
 Zhangping–Longchuan Railway

References

Township-level divisions of Fujian
Longyan